The Château-Gaillard is a French hôtel particulier and an archaeological museum, built in the late Middle Ages in Vannes.

History

Originally built as an administrative building for cardinal Jean de Malestroit, construction of the hotel was completed in 1410. The building was owned by several owners throughout its history, however, in 1912 the building was bought by historical society Société polymathique du Morbihan to house a new museum. On September 22, 1914, President of France Raymond Poincaré officially opened the museum's new collections. The building was federally protected by the Minister of Culture in 1913.

Description
The former Hôtel du Parlement de Bretagne is made up of two main buildings with mullioned windows, served by a spiral staircase located in a polygonal stone tower. At the rear, another narrower spiral staircase leads to the various levels. This building is decorated with Renaissance paintings and woodwork and a coffered ceiling. The roof is supported by a timber roof truss. 

The Pierre de Justice or Breton memorial of the Lande de Justice de Crach, as well as various stones (including lec'hs and milestone) found in the department, were formerly displayed in the courtyard overlooking the rue Noé. This Stone of Justice was listed as a historic monument on January 25, 1937. 

The museum has a collection of artifacts and documents.

Gallery

References

Bibliography

  J. de la Martinière, Le plus ancien manoir de Vannes, in ''Bulletin de la société polymathique du Morbihan, .

Buildings and structures completed in 1410
Buildings and structures in Morbihan
Vannes
Monuments historiques of Morbihan
Archaeological museums in France
1410 establishments in Europe